Warwick was a parliamentary borough consisting of the town of Warwick, within the larger Warwickshire constituency of England.  It returned two Members of Parliament (MPs) to the House of Commons of England from 1295 to 1707, to the House of Commons of Great Britain from 1707 to 1800, and then to the House of Commons of the Parliament of the United Kingdom until 1885.

Under the Redistribution of Seats Act 1885, the constituency was abolished for the 1885 general election, when it was largely replaced by the new single-member constituency of Warwick and Leamington.

Members of Parliament

MPs 1295–1640

MPs 1640–1885

Election results

Elections in the 1830s

 

 
 

 
 

Greville's election was later declared void but no writ was issued for a by-election to elect a new MP.

 
 

Greville resigned, causing a by-election.

 

Canning was elevated to the peerage, becoming 1st Earl Canning and causing a by-election.

Elections in the 1840s

 

Douglas was appointed a commissioner of Greenwich Hospital, requiring a by-election.

Elections in the 1850s

Elections in the 1860s

Elections in the 1870s

Elections in the 1880s

Notes

References
Robert Beatson, A Chronological Register of Both Houses of Parliament (London: Longman, Hurst, Res & Orme, 1807) 
D Brunton & D H Pennington, Members of the Long Parliament (London: George Allen & Unwin, 1954)
Cobbett's Parliamentary history of England, from the Norman Conquest in 1066 to the year 1803 (London: Thomas Hansard, 1808) 
F W S Craig, British Parliamentary Election Results 1832–1885 (2nd edition, Aldershot: Parliamentary Research Services, 1989)
 Maija Jansson (ed.), Proceedings in Parliament, 1614 (House of Commons) (Philadelphia: American Philosophical Society, 1988) 
 J E Neale, The Elizabethan House of Commons (London: Jonathan Cape, 1949)

Warwick
Parliamentary constituencies in Warwickshire (historic)
Constituencies of the Parliament of the United Kingdom established in 1295
Constituencies of the Parliament of the United Kingdom disestablished in 1885